is a district located in Miyazaki Prefecture, Japan.

As of October 1, 2019, the district has an estimated population of 26,460 and the density of 20.4 persons per km2. The total area is 1,294.21 km2.

History

History since the establishment of the county 

 January 26, 1884 - Usuki County becomes Higashiusuki District. The county office is set up in Okatomi. (3 towns and 53 villages)
 May 1, 1889 - New towns and villages system is established, the following towns and villages were established. (2 towns and 16 villages) 
 Nobeoka Town ← Nobeoka Castle, Okatomi Village, Funakura Town (now Nobeoka City)
 Okatomi Village ← Okatomi Village, Hozaijima Village (now Nobeoka City)
 Tsunetomi ← Misu, Tsunetomi, Dekitamura (now Nobeoka)
 Igata Village ← Akamizu Village, Taina Village, Kushizu Tororo Village, Ifukugata Village (now Nobeoka City)
 Kadokawa Village ← Kadokawa Oue Village, Kawauchi Village, Kakusa Village, Angawa Village (now Kadokawa Town)
 Hososhima Town (now Hyuga City)
 Tomitaka Village ← Zaikoji Village, Shiomi Village, Tomitaka Village, Hichiya Village (now Hyuga City)
 Iwawaki ← Koyukiwaki, Hiraiwa (now Hyuga City)
 Togo Village ← San'in Village, Yaehara Sakonouchi Village, Tsuboya Village, Shimosanka Village (now Hyuga City)
 Nango Village ← Uedagawa Village, Nakatogawa Village, Oni Jinno Village, Kammon Village, Mizuseiya Village (now Misato Town)
 Saigo Village ← Yamasanga Village, Ohara Village, Tashiro Village, Tateishi Village (now Misato Town)
 Kitago Village ← Unama Village, Irishita Village, Kuroki Village (now Misato Town)
 Kitakata Village (now Nobeoka City)
 Minakata Village ← Miwa Village, Minakata Village, Onuki Village (now Nobeoka City)
 Tokai Village ← Daitake Town, Awana Village, Inabazaki Village, Kaiko Village, Kawashima Village (now Nobeoka City)
 Kitagawa Village ← Kawauchi Namura, Nagai Village (now Nobeoka City)
 Minamiura ← Urajiri, Sugae, Kumanoe, Shimanoura (now Nobeoka)
 Kitaura ← Furue, Ichimura, Miyanoura, Mikawauchi (now Nobeoka)
 April 1, 1897 - County system enforced.
 October 1, 1921 - Tomitaka village becomes the town of Tomitaka by through the town system. (3 towns and 15 villages)
 April 1, 1923 - The county council is abolished. The county office remains.
 July 1, 1926 - The county government office is abolished. After that, it will be called Area Classification.
 April 1, 1930 - Nobeoka Town, Okatomi Village, Tsunetomi Village merged, Nobeoka Town was reestablished. (3 towns and 13 villages)
 February 11, 1933 - Nobeoka Town became the city of Nobeoka by through the city system and left the county. (2 towns and 13 villages)
 October 25, 1936 - Igata Village and Tokai-mura are incorporated into the city of Nobeoka. (3 towns and 10 villages)
 October 1, 1937 - Tomishima Town was reestablished through the merger of Tomitaka Town and Hososhima Town . (2 towns and 10 villages)
 April 1, 1949 - Nishiusuki district Morotsuka-shiiba changes counties. (2 towns and 12 villages)
 April 1, 1951 - Toshima and Iwawaki-mura merged to form the city of Hyuga , leaving the county. (1 town and 11 villages)
 April 1, 1955 - Minakata Village and Minamiura Village transferred to Nobeoka City. (1 town 9 villages)
 April 1, 1969- Togo Town becomes the township of Togo Town. (2 towns and 8 villages)
 January 11, 1972 - Kitagawa-mura becomes the town of Kitagawa through enforcement of the town system. Kitaura Village also becomes the town of Kitaura.
 January 1, 2006 - Misato Town is established by the merger of Nango Village, Saigo Village, and Kitago Village. (6 towns and 2 villages)
 February 20, 2006 - Kitakata and Kitaura are transferred to Nobeoka. (4 towns and 2 villages)
 February 25, 2006 - Togo Town is incorporated into Hyuga City. (3 towns and 2 villages)
 March 31, 2007 - The town of Kitagawa is incorporated into Nobeoka. (2 towns and 2 villages)

Towns and villages
Kadogawa
Misato
Morotsuka
Shiiba

Districts in Miyazaki Prefecture